Joseph Kossuth Dixon (1856–1926) was an American clergyman, lecturer and photographer who led the Wanamaker expeditions exploring indigenous peoples of the United States.

Biography 
Dixon was born in Hemlock Lake, New York, in 1856, to Irish immigrants Adam Dixon (later a captain for the Union army and ultimately a brigadier general), and Ann Lightfoot Dixon. He attended the Leavenworth Normal School in Kansas and graduated from Rochester Theological Seminary in 1883 with a Bachelor of Divinity. From 1883 to 1889 he was pastor of the First Baptist church in Auburn, New York. He moved to Epiphany Baptist Church in Philadelphia, leaving that post in 1895. That year Dixon was an interim pastor of Sioux Falls, South Dakota's First Baptist church. He ceased ministry later that year and worked for some religious publications before finding work giving lectures for Eastman Kodak from 1904 to 1906. Dixon received a degree from William Jewell College in 1897, and honorary Doctor of Divinity and Doctor of Law degrees from Bucknell University and Temple University, respectively. 

After 1906 he was employed by Wanamaker's, giving educational lectures. Dixon fashioned himself as an expert on Native Americans, and convinced Rodman Wanamaker to fund the Wanamaker expeditions, three trips from 1908 to 1913 that visited Native American tribes, including a 1913 "Expedition of Citizenship". In 1909 Dixon attended a dinner where he talked to prominent Americans such as Buffalo Bill, Nelson A. Miles, and Leonard Wood and they discussed constructing a National American Indian Memorial. Dixon worked to create such a monument.

In 1915 Dixon exhibited his photographs from the expeditions at the Panama–Pacific International Exposition, where he won a gold medal. He spent months lecturing to a total of around a million people. With the American entry into World War I he advocated for Native Americans to enlist and after it ended in 1918 fought for Native veterans to become citizens.

Personal life 
Dixon had three children, Rollin Lester, Florence Gail and Alice Lorraine Dixon with his first wife. His 1st wife divorced him in a contentious proceeding in Boston in 1900.  He married again in 1901 per the 1910 Census for Montgomery County Pennsylvania to a woman, Angelia. When his second wife died in 1925, Dixon married third, Edith Reid, who was his secretary. Dixon died the following year on August 24, 1926 at his home at 1111 Stratford Ave in Melrose Park, Pennsylvania. Funeral services were held on the evening of August 26 and, again, on Saturday, August 28 at the First Baptist Church in Auburn, New York. He was buried at the Fort Hill Cemetery in Auburn.

References

Bibliography

External links

1856 births
1926 deaths
19th-century American clergy
20th-century American photographers